Marco Rota (born 18 September 1942) is an Italian Disney comic artist who served as editor-in-chief of Disney Italia from 1974 to 1988.

Life and career
Rota was born in Milan. His first comic work, was published in 1958 in the magazine .  During the 1960s, he drew stories of Superman and Batman, as well as erotic comics.

Rota made his first Disney comic using the Mickey Mouse character in 1971.  He would go on, however, to work primarily with Donald Duck and Scrooge McDuck stories. His best-known Disney-related work is Andold "Wild Duck" Temerary, Donald's dark age Scottish alter ego; as well as the 1984 story From Egg to Duck, Donald's biography.

In addition to working with established characters, Rota also does original work. As of 2012, he works for the Danish publisher Egmont.

References

External links

Marco Rota at the Lambiek Comiclopedia

1942 births
Living people
Artists from Milan
Italian comics artists
Italian comics writers
Disney comics writers
Disney comics artists